Strange Serenade is an album by American jazz pianist Andrew Hill recorded in 1980 and released on the Italian Soul Note label. The album features three of Hill's original compositions and one written by Laverne Hill performed by a trio.

Reception

The Allmusic review by Ron Wynn awarded the album 4 stars and stated "Hill enters the 80s on a stirring trio note".

Track listing
All compositions by Andrew Hill except as indicated
 "Mist Flower" - 15:26  
 "Strange Serenade" - 7:03  
 "Reunion" - 8:50  
 "Andrew" (Laverne Hill) - 10:40
Recorded at Barigozzi Studios, Milano, Italy on June 13 & 14, 1980

Personnel
Andrew Hill - piano
Alan Silva - bass
Freddie Waits - drums

References

Black Saint/Soul Note albums
Andrew Hill albums
1980 albums